The ITTF–ATTU Asian Cup is an annual table tennis competition held by the International Table Tennis Federation (ITTF) and the Asian Table Tennis Union (ATTU). The first edition was held in 1983. The competition features men's and women's singles events, with 16 players qualifying to take part in each event, subject to a maximum of two players per association.

From 2013 to 2019, the Asian Cup serves as a qualification event for the World Cup.

Results

Men's singles

Women's singles

Men's team

Women's team

a. The 2004 Women's Asian Cup was postponed to November, 2005. And the 2005 Asian Cup was held in December of the same year.

b. The 24th Asian Cup was scheduled in Yokohama, Japan between March 26–27, 2011. Postponed by Japan Table Tennis Association due to associations’ withdrawal caused by the Tōhoku earthquake.

Medal table

See also

Europe Top 16 Cup
PanAm Cup
Asian Table Tennis Championships

References

External links
Records of Asian Cup on the ATTU website
ITTF Statastics

 
T
Table tennis competitions
Table tennis in Asia
Recurring sporting events established in 1983